Grange Hill is a hamlet in County Durham, in England. It is situated to the south of Coundon, near Bishop Auckland.

References

Hamlets in County Durham